This list is a comparison of web conferencing software available for Linux, macOS, and Windows platforms. Many of the applications support the use of videoconferencing.

Comparison chart

Terminology 
In the table above, the following terminology is intended to be used to describe some important features:

Audio Support: the remote control software transfers audio signals across the network and plays the audio through the speakers attached to the local computer. For example, music playback software normally sends audio signals to the locally attached speakers, via some sound controller hardware. If the remote control software package supports audio transfer, the playback software can run on the remote computer, while the music can be heard from the local computer, as though the software were running locally.
Co-Browsing: the navigation of the Web by several people accessing the same web pages at the same time. When session leader clicks on a link, all other users are transferred to the new page. Co-browsers should support multiple frames and support embedded multimedia (e.g., if a page contains a video player, the session leader may commence synchronized playback for all users. Passing URLs via other tools such as a chat or phone and entering them into browser by each user is not considered co-browsing.

File Transfer: the software allows the user to transfer files between the local and remote computers, from within the client program's user interface.
Unified Communications (UC) is a marketing buzzword describing the integration of real-time, enterprise, communication services such as instant messaging (chat), presence information, voice (including IP telephony), mobility features (including extension mobility and single number reach), audio, web & video conferencing, fixed-mobile convergence (FMC), desktop sharing, data sharing (including web connected electronic interactive whiteboards), call control and speech recognition with non-real-time communication services such as unified messaging (integrated voicemail, e-mail, SMS and fax). UC is not necessarily a single product, but a set of products that provides a consistent unified user-interface and user-experience across multiple devices and media-types.

Notes

References

 
Web conferencing software
Conferencing
 
Network software comparisons